The Bemidji State Beavers women's ice hockey program represent the Bemidji State University during the 2017-18 NCAA Division I women's ice hockey season.

Offseason

Recruiting

2017–18 Beavers

Standings

2017–18 Schedule

|-
!colspan=12 style=""| Regular Season

|-
!colspan=12 style=""| WCHA Tournament

References

Bemidji State
Bemidji State Beavers women's ice hockey seasons
Bemidji